Gaby Grossman is an American politician serving as a member of the New Hampshire House of Representatives from the Rockingham 18 district. She assumed office on December 5, 2018.

Education 
Grossman earned a Bachelor of Arts degree in history from Boston University and a Master of Arts in teaching from Lesley University.

Career 
From 2017 to 2020, Grossman was a resident artist at a gallery in Exeter, New Hampshire. She is the owner of the Ames Brook Campground in Ashland, New Hampshire. Grossman became interested in politics and activism after Barack Obama was elected in 2008. Grossman was elected to the New Hampshire House of Representatives in 2018. She serves as a member of the House Children and Family Law Committee. During the 2020 Democratic Party presidential primaries, Grossman endorsed Senator Elizabeth Warren.

References 

Living people
Boston University alumni
Lesley University alumni
People from Exeter, New Hampshire
Democratic Party members of the New Hampshire House of Representatives
Women state legislators in New Hampshire
Year of birth missing (living people)